Abraham Mulamoottil is a Catholic priest, author, teacher, innovator, and philosopher. He obtained his PhD from the Catholic University of Leuven, Belgium.  Mulamoottil founded and became the Principal of MACFAST (Mar Athanasios College for Advanced Studies, Tiruvalla). and introduced unique post graduate courses like MSc Bioinformatics, MSc Plant Biotechnology, MSc Food Science & Technology and MSc Phytomedical Science for the first time in Kerala.

Mulamoottil has also served as chair and chief executive of Pushpagiri Group of Medical Institutions, Tiruvalla.  His vision was influential during the construction of the St. John's Cathedral, Tiruvalla. He founded the first campus community radio in Kerala, RADIO MACFAST 90.4 FM. He also pioneered the first and largest solar project in Kerala. He is also the chief organiser of Centre for Innovation and Development of Affordable Technologies (CIDAT), which is established as a start up platform and a hub of innovation resource facilities in Tiruvalla, Kerala, India, is expanding its base in close association with Kerala Startup Mission, Government of Kerala, India for the establishment of Technology Business Incubator (TBI) at Tiruvalla.

Biography
Mulamoottil Achen was born the fifth of six children to Mariamma and M. V. Varughese on 24 November 1954. He completed his schooling at M.G.M. High School, Thiruvalla and college from SB College Changanassery and joined IMM Seminary in 1970. At the major seminary his love for music and his mellifluous voice made Mulamoottil Achen well known as a singer. His immense talent resulted in the authorities entrusting him with several key positions in the music ministry including the choirmaster of the Apostolic Seminary at Vadavathoor, Kottayam from 1973 to 1980.

In 1998, he had the opportunity to use his musical talent to conduct the Malayalam choir during a Holy Mass at the Asian Bishops Synod held in Vatican. The (late) Pope John Paul II was the main celebrant at this Eucharistic Celebration. He left for higher education in 1991 to Belgium for post-graduation studies at Brussels and joined for Doctoral studies at Catholic university of leuven.

Professional career

After obtaining his PhD from the K. U. Leuven, Belgium (1998), Rev. Dr. Mulamoottil, founded and became the Principal of MACFAST (Mar Athanasios College for Advanced Studies Tiruvalla- 2001) – The Trendsetter in Education – which is a recognised PhD centre for Biosciences, apart from MBA, MCA courses. He also introduced a few MSc courses for the first time in Kerala in the fields of Bioinformatics, Plant
Biotechnology, Food Science & Technology, and Phytomedical Science & Technology. Thereafter, he became the chairman and Chief Executive of Pushpagiri Group of Medical Institutions, Tiruvalla – 'We Care God Cures' –which offers almost all medical undergraduate and postgraduate courses.[22] His innovation and imagination made St. John's Metropolitan Cathedral (2004) one of the architectural marvels recognised by 'Incredible India', and a model of national-religious integration. He initiated the decentralized 'Clean and Green Project' for MACFAST and extended it to the Tiruvalla Municipality. He promoted experiential learning at MACFAST, aimed at making
students change agents and this began with the distribution and marketing of the movie 'The Passion of the Christ' in Kerala. Founding one of the first community radio in Kerala, RADIO MACFAST 90.4 FM (2009). He pioneered the first and biggest Solar project in Kerala installing a 30 kW Solar Power Plant at MACFAST (2011) and 'Vellavum Velichavum' (Water and Solar) 100 kW Solar Electricity and R.O. Water Plant producing 10,000 litres water per hour at Pushpagiri, a model for rural water scheme. He is presently the Chairman of peacepeopleplanet.org – Innovate Our Space – (2013) an agency for the promotion of healthcare, education, green energy, environment and research as well as planning, designing and coordinating CSR activities of firms and establishments. He also set up the peacepeopleplanet store – a green outlet for providing environment friendly and energy efficient products. The organization also started a journal knowledgesocietyonline.com brings up a new ethical quotient called 'ahimsa journalism' He is a nominated member of the District Innovation Council, Pathanamthitta, Government of Kerala. He is currently the chief organiser of Centre for Innovation and Development of Affordable Technologies (CIDAT), which is established as a start up platform and a hub of innovation resource facilities in Tiruvalla, Kerala, India, is expanding its base in close association with Kerala Startup Mission, Government of Kerala, India for the establishment of Technology Business Incubator (TBI) at Tiruvalla.

Books

Puthiya Veenjum Puthiya Kuppiyum (2011)
Vijnana Samooha Nirmiti (2013)
E-Rupee to Reinvent India (2014)
The Tent of the Pilgrim of Exile (2016)

References 

Living people
1954 births
20th-century Indian Roman Catholic priests
Catholic University of Leuven alumni
21st-century Indian Roman Catholic priests